The following is a list of libraries in Australia.

National library 

 National Library of Australia, 6,496,772 items held, largest library in Australia.

State libraries 
 ACT Heritage Library
 State Library of New South Wales
 Northern Territory Library
 State Library of Queensland and John Oxley Library
 State Library of Victoria
 State Library of Western Australia and J S Battye Library
 State Library of South Australia
 State Library of Tasmania

University libraries 
 Australian National University Library
 Bond University Library
 Central Queensland University Library
 Charles Darwin University Library
 Charles Sturt University Library
 Curtin University Library
 Deakin University Library
 Edith Cowan University Library
 Flinders University Library
 Griffith University Library
 James Cook University Library
 La Trobe University Borchardt Library
 Macquarie University Library
 Monash University Libraries
 Murdoch University Library
 Queensland University of Technology Library
 Libraries of RMIT University
 Southern Cross University Library
 Swinburne University of Technology Library
 University of Adelaide Barr Smith Library
 University of Canberra Library
 University of Melbourne Library
 Baillieu Library, University of Melbourne
 University of New England Library
 University of New South Wales Library
 Australian Defence Force Academy Library
 University of Newcastle Library
 University of Notre Dame Australia Library
 University of Queensland Library
 University of South Australia Library
 University of Southern Queensland Library
 University of Sydney Library
 University of Tasmania
 UTS Library
 University of the Sunshine Coast Library
 University of Western Australia Library
 University of Western Sydney Library
 University of Wollongong Library
 Victoria University Library

Public libraries 
Public libraries are united behind common goals and ambitions, share best practice and provide universal free access to information, knowledge and ideas. They are supported by every state and territory in Australia and are often managed within Local Government areas.

Australian Capital Territory 
The Libraries ACT public library system has branches across the territory, including:

ACT Heritage Library
Belconnen Library

Additionally, there are branches in Civic, Dickson, Erindale, Gungahlin, Kingston, Kippax, Tuggeranong and Woden.

New South Wales 

The public libraries in New South Wales are operated by local councils, in some cases cooperatively as "regional libraries".  There are 89 library services which operate more than 350 public libraries across the state.
 Broken Hill City Library
 Fairfield City Open Libraries
 Sutherland Shire Libraries

Northern Territory 
 Alice Springs Public Library

Queensland 
Public libraries in Queensland are operated by local government councils. Local government areas with a population below 15,000 provide public library services through Rural Libraries Queensland (formerly the Country Lending Service), a service provided by the State Library of Queensland. The Queensland public library services and the suburbs and localities they via local libraries, mobile libraries and Indigenous Knowledge Centres are:
 Shire of Aurukun
 Aurukun (Wik Mungkan Indigenous Knowledge Centre)
 Shire of Balonne
 St George, Bollon, Dirranbandi, Hebel, Thallon
 Shire of Banana
 Biloela, Moura, Taroom, Theodore
 Banana, Baralaba, Goovigen, Jambin, Mount Murchison, Prospect Creek (mobile library service)
 Barcaldine Region
 Alpha, Aaramac, Barcaldine, Jericho, Muttaburra
 Shire of Barcoo
 Jundah, Stonehenge, and Windorah
 Blackall-Tambo Region
 Blackall and Tambo
 Shire of Boulia
 Boulia
 City of Brisbane
 Annerley, Ashgrove, Banyo, Bracken Ridge, Brisbane CBD (Brisbane Square), Bulimba, Carina, Carindale, Chermside, Coopers Plains, Corinda, Everton Park, Fairfield, Upper Mount Gravatt (Garden City), Grange, Hamilton, Holland Park, Inala, Indooroopilly, Kenmore, Mitchelton, Mount Coot-tha (Botanic Gardens), Mount Gravatt, Mount Ommaney, New Farm, Nundah, Sandgate, Stones Corner, Sunnybank Hills, Toowong, West End, Wynnum, and Zillmere
 Aspley, Bellbowrie, Brighton, Ellen Grove, Forest Lake, Manly West, Mount Crosby and The Gap (mobile library service)
 Shire of Bulloo
 Thargomindah
 Bundaberg Region
 Bundaberg Central, Childers, Gin Gin, and Woodgate Beach
 Shire of Burdekin
 Ayr, Home Hill
 Shire of Burke
 Burketown
 Cairns Region
 Babinda, Cairns City, Earlville, Edmonton, Gordonvale, Manunda, Smithfield and Stratford
 Shire of Carpentaria
 Normanton and Karumba
 Cassowary Coast Region
 Cardwell, Tully (Dorothy Jones Library), Innisfail and Wongaling Beach.
 Central Highlands Region
 Bauhinia, Blackwater, Capella, Dingo, Duaringa, Emerald, Rubyvale (The Gemfields), Rolleston, Springsure and Tieri.
 Charters Towers Region
 Charters Towers ("Excelsior")
 Aboriginal Shire of Cherbourg
 Cherbourg (Indigenous Knowledge Centre)
 Shire of Cloncurry
 Cloncurry
 Shire of Cook
 Bloomfield and Cooktown
 Shire of Croydon
 Croydon
 Shire of Diamantina
 Bedourie, Birdsville
 Shire of Douglas
 Mossman and Port Douglas
 Shire of Etheridge
 Georgetown
 Shire of Flinders
 Hughenden
 Fraser Coast Region
 Burrum Heads, Pialba (Hervey Bay), Howard, Maryborough (John Anderson & Toys and Special Needs), and Tiaro (Tom Gee Memorial)
 Gladstone Region
 Agnes Water, Boyne Island, Calliope, Gladstone Central, Miriam Vale and Mount Larcom.
 City of Gold Coast
 Broadbeach (at Mermaid Waters), Burleigh Heads, Burleigh Waters, Coolangatta, Elanora, Helensvale, Mudgeeraba, Nerang, Palm Beach, Robina, Runaway Bay, Southport, Upper Coomera.
 Alberton, Ashmore, Benowa, Bonogin, Cedar Creek, Coomera, Currumbin Valley, Gilston, Jacobs Well, Mudgeeraba, Ormeau, Paradise Point, Pimpama, Tugun, Steiglitz, Tallabudgera Valley, Woongoolba.
 Goondiwindi Region
 Goondiwindi, Inglewood, and Texas
 Gympie Region
 Goomeri, Gympie, Imbil, Kilkivan, Rainbow Beach, and Tin Can Bay
 Shire of Hinchinbrook
 Ingham and Halifax
 Aboriginal Shire of Hope Vale
 Hope Vale (Indigenous Knowledge Centre)
 City of Ipswich
 Ipswich Central, Redbank, and Redbank Plains
 Booval, Brassall, Camira, Flinders View (Winston Glades) Goodna, Grandchester, Karalee, Marburg, Rosewood, South Ripley, Springfield Central, Walloon, and Willowbank (mobile service)
 Isaac Region
 Carmila, Clermont, Dysart, Glenden, Middlemount, Moranbah, Nebo, and St Lawrence
 Shire of Livingstone
 Byfield, Marlborough, Emu Park, and Yeppoon
 Mount Chalmers and Stanage Bay (run by volunteers with support from the Livingstone Shire libraries)
 Aboriginal Shire of Lockhart River
 Lockhart River (Indigenous Knowledge Centre)
 Lockyer Valley Region
 Gatton, Laidley
 Logan City
 Beenleigh, Greenbank, Jimboomba, Logan Central, Logan Hyperdome (Shailer Park), Logan North (Underwood), Logan Village, Logan West (Browns Plains), and Marsden
 Longreach Region
 Ilfracombe, Isisford, and Longreach
 Mackay Region
 Mackay, Mount Pleasant, Walkerston, Sarina, Mirani
 Yalboroo, Bloomsbury, Midge Point, Ball Bay, Seaforth, Koumala, Swayneville, Hay Point, St Helens Beach, Calen, Shoal Point, Oakenden, Habana, Blacks Beach, Slade Point, Hampden, Marian, Gargett, Finch Hatton, Homebush, Chelona, McEwens Beach, Bucasia (mobile library service)
 Maranoa Region
 Injune, Jackson, Mitchell, Mungallala, Roma, Surat, Wallumbilla, and Yuleba.
 Shire of Mareeba
 Chillagoe, Dimbulah, Kuranda and Mareeba
 Shire of Mckinlay
 Julia Creek and McKinlay
 Moreton Bay Region
 Albany Creek, Arana Hills, Bongaree (Bribie Island), Burpengary, Caboolture, Deception Bay, North Lakes, Redcliffe, Strathpine, and Woodford
 Beachmere, Bray Park, Dayboro, Donnybrook, Lawnton, Mount Glorious, Mount Mee, Mount Nebo, Mount Samson Petrie, Samford, Toorbul and Warner (mobile library service)
 City of Mount Isa
 Mount Isa City
 Shire of Murweh
 Augathella, Charleville and Morven
 Aboriginal Shire of Napranum
 Napranum (Indigenous Knowledge Centre)
 Noosa Shire
 Noosaville and Cooroy
 Noosa Heads, Sunrise Beach, Cooran, Federal, Kin Kin, Boreen Point, Peregian Beach and Pomona (mobile library service)
 North Burnett Region
 Biggenden, Eidsvold, Gayndah, Monto, Mount Perry, and Mundubbera
 Northern Peninsula Area Region
 Bamaga, Injinoo, New Mapoon, Seisia and Umagico (Indigenous Knowledge Centres)
 Aboriginal Shire of Palm Island
 Palm Island (Indigenous Knowledge Centre)
 Shire of Paroo
 Cunnamulla, Wyandra and Yowah
 Aboriginal Shire of Pormpuraaw
 Pormpuraaw (Indigenous Knowledge Centre)
 Shire of Quilpie
 Quilpie
 Redland City
 Amity Point, Capalaba, Cleveland, Dunwich, Point Lookout, Russell Island and Victoria Point
 Alexandra Hills, Mount Cotton Park, Redland Bay, Thorneside, Victoria Point, and Wellington Point (mobile library service)
 Shire of Richmond
 Richmond
 Rockhampton Region
 Berserker ("Rockhampton North"), Gracemere, Mount Morgan, Rockhampton CBD ("Southside"), West Rockhampton ("Anytime" at Rockhampton Airport).
 Scenic Rim Region
 Beaudesert, Boonah, Canungra and Tamborine Mountain
 Beechmont, Harrisville, Hillview, Kalbar, Kooralbyn, Peak Crossing, Rathdowney and Tamborine (mobile library service)
 Somerset Region
 Esk, Kilcoy, Lowood, and Toogoolawah
 South Burnett Region
 Blackbutt, Kingaroy, Murgon, Nanango, Proston, and Wondai
 Southern Downs Region
 Allora, Stanthorpe, and Warwick
 Dalveen, Karara, Killarney, Leyburn, Maryvale, Pratten, Wheatvale and Yangan (mobile library service)
 Sunshine Coast Region
 Beerwah, Buddina (Kawana), Caloundra, Coolum Beach, Kenilworth, Maleny, Maroochydore and Nambour
 Beerburrum, Bli Bli, Buderim, Caloundra West (Bellvista), Conondale, Eudlo, Eumundi, Glass House Mountains, Little Mountain, Montville, Mooloolah Valley, Mooloolaba (Parkhaven), Mount Coolum, Mountain Creek, Pacific Paradise, Palmwoods, Parklands, Peachester, Pelican Waters, Peregian Springs, Sippy Downs (Chancellor Park) and Yandina (mobile library service)
 Tablelands Region
 Atherton, Herberton, Malanda, Millaa Millaa, Mount Garnet, Ravenshoe and Yungaburra
 Toowoomba Region
 Toowoomba City, Toowoomba, Cecil Plains, Clifton, Crows Nest, Goombungee, Highfields, Millmerran, Oakey, Pittsworth, Quinalow, Yarraman
 Bowenville, Cambooya, Cooyar, Gowrie Junction, Greenmount, Haden, Jondaryan, Kingsthorpe, Kulpi, Meringandan West, Mount Tyson, Westbrook, Wyreema (mobile library service)
 Shire of Torres
 Thursday Island
 Torres Strait Island Region
 Poruma Badu Island, Boigu Island, Dauan Island, Erub Island, Hammond Island, Iama Island, Kubin, Mabuiag, and Warraber (Indigenous Knowledge Centres)
 City of Townsville
 Aitkenvale, Townsville City and Thuringowa Central
 Deeragun & Bluewater, Nelly Bay (Magnetic Island), Rollingstone & Saunders Beach, Alligator Creek and Oakvale (mobile library service)
 Western Downs Region
 Bell, Chinchilla, Dalby, Jandowae, Meandarra, Miles, Moonie, Tara, and Wandoan
 Whitsunday Region
 Bowen, Cannonvale, Collinsville, and Proserpine
 Shire of Winton
 Winton
 Aboriginal Shire of Woorabinda
 Woorabinda (Indigenous Knowledge Centre)
 Aboriginal Shire of Wujal Wujal
 Wujal Wujal (Indigenous Knowledge Centre)
 Aboriginal Shire of Yarrabah
 Yarrabah (Indigenous Knowledge Centre)

South Australia 
Public libraries in South Australia are operated by local councils and most of them are part of the One Card Network, operated by Libraries of SA, a state government department. Community libraries, found in rural and remote areas, are joint-use libraries (school and public) and are usually located in towns too small to support both a public library and a school library.
List derived from Libraries of SA.

Metro

Adelaide City Council Library Service
City Library (Rundle Place)
Hutt St Library
South West Community Centre
Tynte St Library (North Adelaide)
 Adelaide Hills Library Service
Adelaide Hills Mobile Library
(Coventry) Stirling Library
Gumeracha Library
Woodside Library
 Burnside Library
 Campbelltown Public Library
 Charles Sturt Library Service
Charles Sturt Mobile Library
Civic Woodville Library
Findon Library
Henley Beach Library
Hindmarsh Library
West Lakes Library
 Gawler Public Library Service
Evanston Gardens Library
Gawler Administration Centre
Gawler Sport and Community Centre
 Holdfast Bay Library Service
Brighton Library
Glenelg Library
Holdfast Bay History Centre
 Marion Library Service
Cove Civic Centre Library
Cultural Centre Library (Oaklands Park)
Marion Heritage Research Centre
Park Holme Library
 Mitcham Library Service
Blackwood Library
Mitcham Memorial Library
 Mount Barker Community Library
 Norwood Payneham & St Peters Library Service
Norwood Library
Payneham Library
St Peters Library
 Onkaparinga Library Service
Aberfoyle Park (The Hub) Library
Aldinga Library
Noarlunga Library
Seaford Library
Willunga Library
Woodcroft Library
 Playford Library Service
Elizabeth (Playford Civic) Library
Playford Mobile Library
Stretton Centre Library
 Port Adelaide Enfield Library Service
Enfield Library
Greenacres Library
Parks Library
Port Adelaide Library
Semaphore Library
 Prospect Public Library
 Salisbury Library Service
Ingle Farm Library
Len Beadell (Salisbury) Library
Mawson Lakes Library
Para Hills Library
Salisbury West Library
 Tea Tree Gully Library
 Unley Library Service
Fullarton Park Depot
Goodwood Library
Unley Civic Library
Unley Museum
 Walkerville Public Library
 West Torrens Library Service
Hamra Centre Library
West Torrens Mobile Library

Regional and Community Libraries

 Andamooka School Community Library
 Adelaide Plains Library Service
Mallala Library
Two Wells Library
 Alexandrina Library Service
Goolwa Library
Milang Depot
Mt Compass Depot
Pt Elliot Depot
Strathalbyn Library
 Barossa Library Service
Angaston Library
Lyndoch Library
Mount Pleasant Library
Nuriootpa Library
Tanunda Library
 Barunga West Council
Bute Depot
Port Broughton Area School Community Library
 Berri Barmera Council
Barmera Public Library Service
Berri Library Service
Ceduna School Community Library
 Clare and Gilbert Valleys Council
Auburn Library
Clare Library
Clare Regional History Group
Riverton and District High School Library
Saddleworth Library & Community Centre Branch
 Cleve School Community Library
 Coober Pedy School Community Library
Coorong District Council
Coomandook School Community Library
Meningie School Community Library
Tailem Bend School Community Library
Tintinara Coonalpyn School Community Library
 Copper Coast Council
Kadina Library
Moonta Library
Wallaroo Library
Cowell School Community Library
 District Council of Elliston
Elliston Depot
Lock School Community Library
 District Council of Karoonda East Murray
East Murray School Community Library
Karoonda School Community Library
 District Council of Lower Eyre Peninsula
Coffin Bay Depot
Cummins School Community Library
 District Council of Streaky Bay
Karcultaby School Community Library
Streaky Bay School Community Library
 Flinders Mobile Library Service
Jamestown School Community Library
 Kangaroo Island Library Service
Kingscote Library
Penneshaw Depot
Kimba School Community Library
 Kingston Community School Library
 Leigh Creek School Community Library
 Light Regional Public Library Service
Freeling Depot
Greenock Depot
Kapunda Library
 Loxton Waikerie Library Service
Loxton Library
Waikerie Library
 Mid Murray Council
Cambrai School Community Library
Mannum School Community Library
Morgan Library
Swan Reach Community Library
 Mount Gambier Library
 Murray Bridge Library
 Naracoorte Lucindale Council
Lucindale School Community Library
Orroroo School Community Library
 Peterborough School and Community Library
Port Augusta Library
Port Lincoln Library
Port MacDonnell (Mary Lattin Memorial) Library
Port Pirie Regional Library Service
Crystal Brook Library
Port Pirie Library
 Regional Council of Goyder
Burra School Community Library
Eudunda School Community Library
Renmark Paringa Public Library
Robe Public Library
Roxby Downs Community Library
 Southern Mallee District Council
Geranium Community Library Depot
Lameroo School Community Library
Pinnaroo School Community Library
 Tatiara District Council
Bordertown Public Library
Keith Community Library
 The Flinders Ranges Council
Hawker School Community Library
Quorn School Community Library
Tumby Bay School Community Library
Victor Harbor Public Library
 Wakefield Regional Council
Balaklava Community Library
Snowtown School Community Library
 Wattle Range Council
Beachport Library
Millicent Library
Penola School Community Library
Whyalla Public Library
Woomera Community Library
 Wudinna School Community Library
Yankalilla Library
 Yorke Peninsula Council
Ardrossan School Community Library
Central Yorke Peninsula (Maitland) Community Library
Minlaton Library Curramulka Depot
Minlaton Library Port Vincent Depot
Minlaton School Community Library
Yorketown School Community Library

Victoria 

 St Kilda Library
 MacFarland Library, Ormond College
 Ringwood Library: Edmond and Corrigan
 List of libraries in Melbourne
 Wyndham Libraries
 Casey Cardinia Libraries
 Yarra Plenty Regional Library
 Eastern Regional Libraries (Victoria)
 Wimmera Regional Library Corporation
 Geelong Library and Heritage Centre

Western Australia 
 City of Perth Library
 Toodyay Public Library
 Alexander Library Building

Special libraries 

Special libraries provide specialized information resources for their parent organisation. Common types of special libraries include art libraries, law libraries, legislative or parliamentary libraries, music libraries, medical libraries, government departmental libraries and science libraries. Some types have their own associations including art libraries (ARLIS/ANZ, the Art Library Society of Australia and New Zealand), law libraries (Australian Law Librarians Association), and music libraries (International Association of Music Libraries Australia).

 Women's Studies Resource Centre South Australia, now closed
The Women's Library
 Australian Lesbian and Gay Archives
 Indigenous Knowledge Centre
 Jessie Street National Women's Library
 Allport Library and Museum of Fine Arts
 Auscape International Photo Library
 Australian Institute of Aboriginal and Torres Strait Islander Studies
 Katie Zepps Nursing Library
 Radcliffe Theosophical Library (Adelaide)

Art libraries

Australian Capital Territory 

 National Gallery of Australia Research Library
 National Portrait Gallery Research Library

New South Wales 
 Edmund and Joanna Capon Research Library (Art Gallery of New South Wales)
 National Art School Library

Queensland 
 Queensland Art Gallery and Gallery of Modern Art (QAGOMA) Research Library

South Australia 
 Adelaide Central School of Art Library
 Art Gallery of South Australia Research Library

Victoria 
 Shaw Research Library (National Gallery of Victoria)

Museum libraries

Australian Capital Territory 

 National Museum of Australia research library

New South Wales 

 Australian Museum Research Library

Queensland 

 Queensland Museum Library

South Australia 

 South Australian Museum Library

Tasmania 

 Mona Library
 Tasmanian Museum and Art Gallery Library

Victoria 
 Museums Victoria Library

Legislative libraries 

The legislative libraries are commonly known in Australia as parliamentary libraries.  Amongst this group of libraries are some of the oldest libraries in Australia.  The Parliamentary Library in New South Wales is the oldest and was established in 1840.  The most recent parliamentary library to be established in 1989 is the ACT Legislative Assembly Library.

Independent libraries

New South Wales 

 Jessie Street National Women's Library
 Sydney Mechanics' School of Arts

Queensland 
 The Australian Cultural Library

Victoria 
 Australian Lesbian and Gay Archives

Mechanics Institutes

New South Wales 

Sydney Mechanics' School of Arts
 Kogarah School of Arts
 Fairfield School of Arts
 Peakhurst School of Arts
Mechanics' Institute Lawson, Blue Mountains
Carlingford Mechanics' Institute
Penrith Mechanic Institute
 Kogarah School of Arts (1886)
The Blacktown Mutual Improvement Association (1905)
 Oatley School of Arts (1905)
(See also Mechanics Institutes of Australia).
Batlow Literary Institute
Cookamidgera, Mechanic Institute Hall
 
Grenfeld Mechanics Institute
Gundagai Literary Institute
 Goulburn Mechanics' Institute
Howlong Mechanics Institute
 Braidwood Literary Institute
 Cathcart Literary Institute
 Grafton School of Arts Library
Nelligen Mechanics Institute
Singleton mechanic Institute.
Sunny Corner, New South Wales School of Arts
Yass Mechanics Institute
 Wingello Mechanics Institute

South Australia 
Curramulka Institute
Edithburgh Institute
Balaklava Institute Hall
Beachport, South Australia Institute
Cambrai, South Australia Institute
Cobdogla Institute
Coonalpyn Institute
Dawson Mechanics Institute
Dublin Institute
Freeling Institute
Farrell Flat Institute
Hamley Bridge Institute
Owen Institute
Karoonda 

Macclesfield Institute
Mannum Institute
Mintaro Institute
Mitcham Institute
Morgan Institute
Mount Gambier Institute
Nackara Institute
Pinnaroo Institute
Pine Point Memorial Institute
Port Vincent Institute
Ramco Institute
Saddleworth Institute
Stansbury Memorial Institute
Terowie  Institute and Council Chamber
Waikerie Institute
Wasleys Institute

Tasmania 

Mechanics' Institute Launceston, Tasmania, Australia
Mechanics' Institute, Sorrento
Merton Mechanics' Institute
Van Diemen's Land Mechanics' Institute

Victoria

Mechanics' Institutes that still operate as libraries 
Only a few mechanics' institutes still operate as libraries: list derived from the Mechanics' Institute of Victoria, Inc.'s Library Directory 2018.

 Ballaarat Mechanics' Institute
 Berwick Mechanics Institute and Free Library
 Bonnie Doon Community Centre
 Footscray Mechanics' Institute
 Little River Mechanics' Institute
 Maldon Athenaeum Library
 Melbourne Athenaeum Library
 Prahran Mechanics' Institute, the only Mechanics’ Institute in Victoria which has its own Act of Parliament for its incorporation.
 Port Fairy Library and Lecture Hall, 1860
 Trafalgar Mechanics’ Institute and Free Library, 1889
 Stanley Athenaeum and Public Room
 Talbot Community Library & Arts Centre

Other Mechanics' Institutes 

 Binalong, Victoria Mechanics Institute
 Brunswick, Victoria Mechanics Institute
 Ballan Mechanics Institute  1860
 Berwick Mechanics’ Institute and Free Library, 1862
 Briagolong Mechanics’ Institute, 1874
 Bunyip Mechanics’ Institute 1905
 Glengarry Mechanics’ Institute, 1886
 Geelong Mechanics Institute
 Wiiliamstown Mechanics Institute
 Burke and Wills Institute, Fryertown Victoria
 Long Gully Mechanics Institute,
 Longwarry Mechanics’ Institute and Free Library, 1886  
 Malmsbury Mechanics’ Institute, 1862
 Meeniyan Mechanics’ Institute, 1892
Melbourne mechanics institute now part of the Victorian state library
 Rosedale Mechanics’ Institute , 1863
 Stratford Mechanics’ Institute., 1866
 Toongabbie Mechanics’ Institute, 1883

Alexandra, Victoria School of Arts
Ballarat Mechanics Institute
Ballan Mechanics Institute
Charlton, Mechanics Institute
Drysdale Free Library
Elmhurst Mechanics Institute
Echuca Mechanics' Institute, Victoria
Great Western Mechanics Institute
Healesville Mechanics Institute
Kyneton Mechanics Institute
Horsham, Mechanics Institute
Leongatha Mechanics Institute
Lilydale Mechanics Institute
Moonambel Mechanics Institute
Mornington Mechanics Institute
Morongla Creek Mechanics Institute Hall
Murrumburrah#gallery Institute
Macarthur, Victoria Mechanisc Institute Hall
Nagambie Mechanics Institute
Riddells Creek Mechanics Institute
Rushworth Mechanics Institute
Winiam, Shire of Lowan Mechanis Institute Library
Woodend Mechanics Institute
Yandoit Mechanics Institute

Queensland 
West End School of Arts

Western Australia 
Guildford Mechanics Institute
South Perth Old Mill Theatre
Swan River Mechanics' Institute
Toodyay Mechanics Institute
Mechanics Institute of West Australia

Gallery

Victoria

New South Wales

South Australia

Schools of Arts

New South Wales 
 
 Arncliffe School of Arts hall/Council Hall
 Balmain Workingmen's Institute closed
  Bathurst School of Arts
 Baulkham Hills now defunct. 
 Berry School of Arts
Blacktown School of Arts
 Bourke School of Arts
 Burrawang School of Arts
 Buxton, New South Wales
 Carlton School of Arts hall Active
 Clarencetown School of Arts
 Cronulla School of Arts 	Active
 Epping School of Arts, Epping, New South Wales
 Fairfield School of Arts
 Glebe School of Arts	recycled
 Glen Oaks School of Arts
 Granville School of Arts	Now a college
 Guildford Soldiers' Memorial School of Arts	 Active
 Leichhardt School of Arts hall Hall
 Newtown School of art
 Queanbeyan School of Arts
 Peakhurst School of Arts	Active
 Penrith School of Arts closed
 Richmond School of Arts    active
 Rockdale School of Arts hall Council Hall
 Rollands Plains, New South Wales
 Rooty Hill School of Arts
 Rozelle Mechanics' Institute hall 	Hall
 St Albans School of Arts Hall
 Seaham School of Arts
 Tenterfield School of Arts
 Wentworth Falls School of Arts
 Wilberforce
 Windsor School of Arts, Bridge Street, Thompson Square

Queensland 
Notable schools of arts in Queensland include:
 Baree School of Arts
 Brisbane School of Arts
 Bundaberg School of Arts
 Cairns School of Arts
 Coorparoo School of Arts and RSL Memorial Hall
 Eumundi School of Arts
 Gympie School of Arts
 Herberton School of Arts
 Irvinebank School of Arts Hall
 Maryborough School of Arts
 Numinbah Valley School of Arts
 Old Ipswich Town Hall
 Ravenswood School of Arts
 Rockhampton School of Arts
 Townsville School of Arts
 Woody Point Memorial Hall
 Yangan School of Arts

References